Il corsaro della mezzaluna, internationally released as Pirate of the Half Moon, is a 1957 Italian adventure film directed by Giuseppe Maria Scotese and starring John Derek.

Plot    
In sixteenth century Italy, a poet turns pirate after a traitor gains control of his homeland.

Cast 
 John Derek: Paolo Di Valverde/Nadir El Krim 
 Gianna Maria Canale: Infanta Caterina 
 Ingeborg Schöner: Angela
 Alberto Farnese: Alonzo De Carmona Allias Ugo Van Berg 
 Camillo Pilotto: Barone Alfonso Di Camerlata 
 Raf Mattioli: Vasco 
 Paul Muller: Carlo V
 Gianni Rizzo: Visconte Di Gand 
 Yvette Masson: Rosa 
 Ignazio Leone: Nicola  
 Carlo Hintermann: Il Ticinese

References

External links
 

1957 films
1950s adventure drama films
Italian adventure drama films
Pirate films
Films set in the Mediterranean Sea
Films directed by Giuseppe Maria Scotese
Films set in the 16th century
1957 drama films
Films scored by Renzo Rossellini
1950s Italian films